Arenda Lauretta Wright Allen (born December 9, 1960) is a United States district judge of the United States District Court for the Eastern District of Virginia. She formerly worked as an Assistant United States Attorney and a Federal Public Defender in Norfolk, Virginia.

Early life and education
Born in Philadelphia, Wright Allen graduated from Kutztown University of Pennsylvania (then called Kutztown State College) with her Bachelor of Arts degree in 1982 and later from North Carolina Central University School of Law with a Juris Doctor in 1985. In May 2013, Wright Allen was awarded an honorary doctorate from Kutztown University of Pennsylvania.

Legal career
Wright Allen started her legal career as a Judge Advocate General's Corps officer in the United States Navy as an active duty officer between 1985 and 1990 and in the United States Navy Reserve between 1992 and 2005. She was an Assistant United States Attorney in the Eastern District of Virginia from 2001 to 2005. Wright Allen joined the Federal Public Defender's Office for the Eastern District of Virginia in 2005, where she had served as a Supervisory Assistant Federal Public Defender until becoming a federal judge in 2011.

Federal judicial service
On the recommendation of Senators Jim Webb and Mark R. Warner, Wright Allen was nominated to the United States District Court for the Eastern District of Virginia by President Barack Obama on December 1, 2010 to a seat vacated Jerome B. Friedman, who assumed senior status on November 30, 2010. The United States Senate confirmed Wright Allen on May 11, 2011 in a 96–0 vote.  She received her judicial commission the following day.

Overturning Virginia's same-sex marriage ban
On February 13, 2014, Allen overturned Virginia's statutory same-sex marriage ban, finding the ban unconstitutional. In her ruling, Allen inadvertently attributed the principle that "all men are created equal" to the U.S. Constitution, rather than the Declaration of Independence – an error which she corrected in a subsequent amended ruling.

Personal life
Allen is married to Delroy Allen, a retired Jamaican-American soccer player.

See also 
 List of African-American federal judges
 List of African-American jurists

References

External links

1960 births
Living people
African-American female military personnel
African-American judges
African-American lawyers
American women lawyers
Assistant United States Attorneys
Judges of the United States District Court for the Eastern District of Virginia
Kutztown University of Pennsylvania alumni
North Carolina Central University alumni
Lawyers from Philadelphia
People from Norfolk, Virginia
Public defenders
United States district court judges appointed by Barack Obama
21st-century American judges
United States Navy reservists
Female United States Navy officers
21st-century American women judges
African-American United States Navy personnel